Thomas Houldsworth (13 September 1771 – 1 September 1852) was a Tory, and then Conservative Party, politician in England.  He was a Member of Parliament (MP) for 34 years, from 1818 to 1852.

Houldsworth MP for Pontefract from 1818 to 1830, and then for the rotten borough of Newton in Lancashire from 1830 until the borough was disenfranchised at 1832 general election.  He was then elected for the Northern division of Nottinghamshire, and held that seat until he stepped down from the House of Commons at the general election in July 1852. He died two months later, aged 80.

References

External links 
 

1771 births
1852 deaths
Tory MPs (pre-1834)
Conservative Party (UK) MPs for English constituencies
UK MPs 1818–1820
UK MPs 1820–1826
UK MPs 1826–1830
UK MPs 1830–1831
UK MPs 1831–1832
UK MPs 1832–1835
UK MPs 1835–1837
UK MPs 1837–1841
UK MPs 1841–1847
UK MPs 1847–1852